Acústico, Vol. II is the 19th album and third live album of Puerto Rican singer Ednita Nazario. Is the second of two albums recorded during a special presentation of her at the Luis A. Ferré Performing Arts Center in San Juan, Puerto Rico.

The album is the realization of a unique project of Nazario where she turned the Arts Center into a recording studio, inviting 300 friends to share with her that night.

The album includes special appearances by singer Jorge Laboy.

The album was released in 2002.

Track listing
 "Espíritu Libre"
 "Quiero Que Me Hagas El Amor"
 "Te Sigo Esperando"
 "Medley"
"La Prohibida"
"A Que No Le Cuentas"
 "Lo Mejor De Tí"
 "Tres Deseos"
 "Devuélveme"
 "Lo Que Son Las Cosas"
 "Medley"
"Como Antes"
"Contigo Mi Amor" (with Jorge Laboy)
"Mi Corazón Tiene Mente Propia"
 "Aprenderé"
 "Fruto De Tu Boca"

Awards

Billboard Latin Music Awards

Personnel
 Produced by Ednita Nazario

References

Ednita Nazario live albums
2002 live albums
Spanish-language live albums